An antifuse is an electrical device that performs the opposite function to a fuse. Whereas a fuse starts with a low resistance and is designed to permanently break an electrically conductive path (typically when the current through the path exceeds a specified limit), an antifuse starts with a high resistance, and programming it converts it into a permanent electrically conductive path (typically when the voltage across the antifuse exceeds a certain level). This technology has many applications.

Christmas tree lights
Antifuses are best known for their use in mini-light (or miniature) style low-voltage Christmas tree lights. Ordinarily (for operation from mains voltages), the lamps are wired in series. (The larger, traditional, C7 and C9 style lights are wired in parallel and are rated to operate directly at mains voltage.) Because the series string would be rendered inoperable by a single lamp failing, each bulb has an antifuse installed within it. When the bulb blows, the entire mains voltage is applied across the single blown lamp. This rapidly causes the antifuse to short out the blown bulb, allowing the series circuit to resume functioning, albeit with a larger proportion of the mains voltage now applied to each of the remaining lamps. The antifuse is made using wire with a high resistance coating and this wire is coiled over the two vertical filament support wires inside the bulb. The insulation of the antifuse wire withstands the ordinary low voltage imposed across a functioning lamp but rapidly breaks down under the full mains voltage, giving the antifuse action. Occasionally, the insulation fails to break down on its own, but tapping the blown lamp will usually cause it to make a connection. Often a special bulb with no antifuse and often a slightly different rating (so it blows first as the voltage gets too high) known as a "fuse bulb" is incorporated into the string of lights to protect against the possibility of severe overcurrent if too many bulbs fail.

A much earlier application of antifuses was in the old series-connected streetlights. Each luminaire had a removable light socket, which had a pair of contacts that extended above the socket. These contacts had a dual purpose - they connected the socket to the mounting assembly inside the luminaire, and the upper portion of these contacts held a replaceable, dime-size 'cutout' (an early form of antifuse). In this respect, these street light loops operated identically to the above mentioned Christmas light strings.

Antifuses in integrated circuits
Antifuses are widely used to permanently program integrated circuits (ICs).

Certain programmable logic devices (PLDs), such as structured ASICs, use fuse technology to configure logic circuits and create a customized design from a standard IC design. Antifuse PLDs are one time programmable in contrast to other PLDs that are SRAM-based and which may be reprogrammed to fix logic bugs or add new functions. Antifuse PLDs have advantages over SRAM based PLDs in that like ASICs, they do not need to be configured each time power is applied. They may be less susceptible to alpha particles which can cause circuits to malfunction. Also circuits built via the antifuse's permanent conductive paths may be faster than similar circuits implemented in PLDs using SRAM technology. QuickLogic Corporation refers to their antifuses as "ViaLinks" because blown fuses create a connection between two crossing layers of wiring on the chip in the same way that a via on a printed circuit board creates a connection between copper layers.

Antifuses may be used in programmable read-only memory (PROM). Each bit contains both a fuse and an antifuse and is programmed by triggering one of the two. This programming, performed after manufacturing, is permanent and irreversible.

Dielectric antifuses
Dielectric antifuses employ a very thin oxide barrier between a pair of conductors. Formation of the conductive channel is performed by a dielectric breakdown forced by a high voltage pulse. Dielectric antifuses are usually employed in CMOS and BiCMOS processes as the required oxide layer thickness is lower than those available in bipolar processes.

Amorphous silicon antifuses
One approach for the ICs that use antifuse technology employs a thin barrier of non-conducting amorphous silicon between two metal conductors. When a sufficiently high voltage is applied across the amorphous silicon it is turned into a polycrystalline silicon-metal alloy with a low resistance, which is conductive.

Amorphous silicon is a material usually not used in either bipolar or CMOS processes and requires an additional manufacturing step.

The antifuse is usually triggered using an approximately 5 mA current. With a poly-diffusion antifuse, the high current density creates heat, which melts a thin insulating layer between polysilicon and diffusion electrodes, creating a permanent resistive silicon link.

Zener antifuses
Zener diodes can be used as antifuses. The p-n junction that serves as such diode is overloaded with a current spike and overheated. At temperatures above 100 °C and current densities above 105 A/cm2 the metallization undergoes electromigration and forms spikes through the junction, shorting it out; this process is known as Zener zap in the industry. The spike is formed on and slightly below the silicon surface, just below the passivation layer without damaging it. The conductive shunt therefore does not compromise integrity and reliability of the semiconductor device. Typically a few-millisecond pulse at 100-200 mA is sufficient for common bipolar devices, for a non-optimized antifuse structure; specialized structures will have lower power demands. The resulting resistance of the junction is in the range of 10 ohms.

The Zener antifuses can be made without additional manufacturing steps with most CMOS, BiCMOS and bipolar processes; hence their popularity in analog and mixed-signal circuits. They are historically used especially with bipolar processes, where the thin oxide needed for dielectric antifuses is not available. Their disadvantage, however, is lower area efficiency compared to other types.

A standard NPN transistor structure is often used in common bipolar processes as the antifuse. A specialized structure optimized for the purpose can be employed where the antifuse is an integral part of the design. The terminals of the antifuses are usually accessible as bonding pads and the trimming process is performed before wire-bonding and encapsulating the chip. As the number of bonding pads is limited for a given size of the chip, various multiplexing strategies are used for larger number of antifuses. In some cases a combined circuit with zeners and transistors can be used to form a zapping matrix; with additional zeners, the trimming (which uses voltages higher than the normal operational voltage of the chip) can be performed even after packaging the chip.

Zener zap is frequently employed in mixed-signal circuits for trimming values of analog components. For example a precision resistor can be manufactured by forming several series resistors with Zeners in parallel (oriented to be nonconductive during normal operation of the device) and then shorting selected Zeners to shunt the unwanted resistors. By this approach, it is possible only to lower the value of the resulting resistor. It is therefore necessary to shift the manufacturing tolerances so that the lowest-value typically made is equal to or larger than the desired value. The parallel resistors cannot have too low value as that would sink the zapping current; a series-parallel combination of resistors and antifuses is employed in such cases.

Street-lighting (obsolete)
In a similar fashion to that of Christmas tree lights, before the advent of high-intensity discharge lamps, street light circuits using incandescent light bulbs were often operated as high-voltage series circuits. Each individual street-lamp was equipped with a film cutout; a small disk of insulating film that separated two contacts connected to the two wires leading to the lamp. In the same fashion as with the Christmas lights described above, if the lamp failed, the entire voltage of the street lighting circuit (thousands of volts) was imposed across the insulating film in the cutout, causing it to rupture. In this way, the failed lamp was bypassed and illumination restored to the rest of the street. Unlike Christmas lights, the circuit usually contained an automatic device to regulate the electric current flowing in the circuit, such as a constant-current transformer. As each series lamp burned out and was shorted out, the AC current regulator reduced the voltage, which kept each remaining bulb operating at its normal voltage, current, brightness, and life expectancy. When the failed lamp was finally replaced, a new piece of film was also installed, again separating the electrical contacts in the cutout. This style of street lighting was recognizable by the large porcelain insulator that separated the lamp and reflector from the light's mounting arm; the insulator was necessary because the two contacts in the lamp's base may have routinely operated at a potential of several thousands of volts above ground/earth.

See also
Crowbar (circuit)
Diac
Lightning arrester
Transient voltage suppression diode
Varistor

References

External links
Information on use of antifuses in Christmas lights (They avoid use of the term antifuse presumably because of their non-technical audience.)
More information on the types of Christmas lights

Digital electronics